Mešanović is a Bosnian surname. Notable people with the surname include:

Alen Mešanović (born 1975), former Bosnian footballer
Enes Mešanović (born 1975), Bosnian football manager former player
Jasmin Mešanović (born 1992), Bosnian footballer
Muris Mešanović (born 1990), Bosnian footballer
Semir Mesanovic (born 1981), former Bosnian-Canadian footballer 

Bosnian surnames
Slavic-language surnames
Patronymic surnames